The BRICS U-17 Football Cup is a U-17 Football tournament played among teams of five BRICS countries - economic block formed by Brazil, Russia, India, China and South Africa. The first historic edition was played in Goa, India in 2016 on the occasion of the 8th BRICS summit that was held in India. The Tournament will take place once every year with 10-day and following the lines of the tournaments under-17 FIFA. Each edition will be held in a BRICS nation. On 1 October 2016 The Prime Minister of India Shri Narendra Modi, unveiled the Trophy for the 2016 BRICS U-17 Football Tournament in London.

Brics Football Cup was not held in 2017 during the Xiamen Summit, but the tournament come back for the second edition for Johannesburg Summit, 2018. In this edition Women's U-17 teams of respective countries competed for the cup.

History

Format
On the very first tournament, held in Goa, India a round-robin stage was played. From this round, 1st and 2nd teams of points table entered final and on the other hand 3rd and 4th teams of points table entered 3rd place game respectively. 5th team was directly eliminated after first round.

In the second edition, only round-robin stage was played in Johannesburg, South Africa. The teams were given awards according to their places in points table after round-robin stage.

Teams

Results

‡ There was no knock-out match played, the tournament was played as league tournament, team with highest point won the cup, in this case Brazil.

Team performance

See also
 BRICS

References

External links
 

BRICS
Recurring sporting events established in 2016